Manchete Futebol Clube do Recife, also known as Manchete, is a Brazilian football club based in Recife, Pernambuco state. The club was runner-up in the Série C once.

History
The club was founded on January 1, 1950 as Associação Atlética das Vovozinhas. Vovozinhas was renamed to Associação Atlética Santo Amaro in 1965. As Santo Amaro, the club finished as runner-up in the 1981 Série C, when they were defeated by Olaria. Santo Amaro was later renamed to Associação Atlética Casa Caiada, and then as Recife Futebol Clube in 1994. They won the Copa Pernambuco in 1996, 1997, 2000 and in 2002. The club is known as Manchete Futebol Clube do Recife since February 2, 2004.

Achievements

 Série C:
 Runners-up (1): 1981
 Copa Pernambuco:
 Winners (4): 1996, 1997, 2000, 2002

Stadium
Manchete Futebol Clube do Recife play their home games at Estádio Agamenon Magalhães. The stadium has a maximum capacity of 1,200 people.

References

Association football clubs established in 1950
Football clubs in Pernambuco
1950 establishments in Brazil